The 1922–23 William & Mary Indians men's basketball team represented the College of William & Mary in intercollegiate basketball during the 1922–23 season. Under the fourth, and final, year of head coach James G. Driver (who concurrently served as the head baseball coach), the team finished the season with an 8–4 record. This was the 18th season of the collegiate basketball program at William & Mary, whose nickname is now the Tribe.

Schedule

|-
!colspan=9 style="background:#006400; color:#FFD700;"| Regular season

Source

References

William & Mary Tribe men's basketball seasons
William And Mary Indians
William and Mary Indians Men's Basketball Team
William and Mary Indians Men's Basketball Team